Pseudotrechus mutilatus is a species of beetle in the family Carabidae, the only species in the genus Pseudotrechus.

References

Lebiinae